iDTGV was a wholly owned subsidiary of the French state-owned train company SNCF, operating high-speed TGV services on multiple LGV lines throughout France. All trains run either to or from Paris, serving 12 French stations. Tickets can only be purchased online up to 6 months in advance.

The service was discontinued at the end of 2017 to be partially replaced by Ouigo.

Concept
Tickets for iDTGV can only be purchased online. Each train comprises two different atmospheres, making for a more personalized journey. Booking for each train opens up 6 months before departure, with prices starting at €19 per person on all routes. Following booking, all services can be purchased online, frequently at a reduced cost to on the train itself.

Ambience
Trains are separated into two carriage zones: iDzen and iDzap. iDzen, popular with business travelers, is for customers wishing a quiet trip, with mobile phones and loud conversations prohibited. iDzap is best suited to families or holidaymakers, with more leniency on noise and a bolder, more exciting atmosphere. Food is served at various intervals in the iDzap area. People travelling in first class have access to a power socket, as well as wider seats and more legroom.

Services
Food is available onboard from a buffet car located in either carriages 4 or 14 depending on the train. In partnership with Navendis, iDTGV operates its own pre-booked taxi service called iDcab, serving the Île-de-France region. Tablets, offering a variety of films and games, can be rented along with headphones for a minimal sum. Seats can be chosen at any time during or after booking, however tickets must be reprinted each time any service is added or changed.

Luggage
Luggage allowances on iDTGVs are stricter than on standard TGVs: each passenger is entitled to just 1 piece of hand luggage and 1 suitcase with their ticket. A baggage supplement of €35 applies to any additional bags, however this rises to €45 when paid upon boarding.

Notes and references

External links
Official iDTGV site (English)

Named passenger rail services of France
SNCF brands
TGV